Rahden station is the northernmost station in the German state of North Rhine-Westphalia in the town of Rahden in the Kreis (district) of Minden-Lübbecke. It is located at the northern end of the remaining section of the branch line from Bünde (where there is a connection to the Löhne–Rheine railway), with a connection to Herford station on the Hamm–Minden railway.

History 

Rahden station was opened on 1 October 1899 at the end point of the railway line from Bünde, which was opened at the same time. Exactly one year later, another section was opened to Sulingen and the remainder of the line to Bassum was taken into operation. On 15 January 1910 this was followed by the opening of the line to Nienburg.

Passenger services to Nienburg were abandoned on 29 September 1968 and the section between Uchte and Nienburg was closed at the end of 1996.

Passenger services to Bassum were abandoned on 27 May 1994. This was followed by the closing of freight traffic on the section between Rahden and Barenburg on 1 September 1995 before this section of the line was closed at the end of 1997.

Location 

Rahden station is located on the eastern edge of the town centre. It is located on the railway that formerly ran between Bassum and Herford, which is also called the Ravensberg Railway (Ravensberger Bahn). This now runs from Rahden via Bassum to Herford on the Hamm–Minden Railway.

Since Easter 2009 Auenland-Draisinen GmbH has operated a draisine service on a disused section of the line from Rahden to Ströhen.

The Museumseisenbahn Rahden-Uchte operates steam excursions on the former Nienburg–Rahden railway from the station during the summer months.

Rail services 

Rahden station is served by a Regionalbahn service (RB71), which is operated by Eurobahn with modern Bombardier Talent diesel railcars.

Notes 

Railway stations in North Rhine-Westphalia
Railway stations in Germany opened in 1899